is a Japanese professional shogi player ranked 5-dan.

Early life
Hasebe was born in Oyama, Tochigi on April 15, 1994. He learned how to play shogi from his father when he was about five years old.

In March 2007, Hasebe was accepted into the Japan Shogi Association (JSA) apprentice school at the rank of 6-kyū under the tutelage of shogi professional Takehiro Ōhira. He was promoted to the rank of apprentice professional 3-dan in 2016, and obtained full professional status and the corresponding rank of 4-dan in April 2018 tying for first with Takashi Ikenaga in the 62nd 3-dan League (October 2017March 2018) with a record of 14 wins and 4 losses.

Promotion history
The promotion history for Hasebe is as follows.
 6-kyū: March 2007 
 3-dan: April 2016 
 4-dan: April 1, 2018
 5-dan: October 13, 2022

References

External links
 ShogiHub: Professional Player Info · Hasebe, Kōhei

Japanese shogi players
Living people
Professional shogi players
Professional shogi players from Tochigi Prefecture
1994 births